"I before E except after C" is a mnemonic rule of thumb for English spelling.

I before E except after C may also refer to:
 "I Before E Except After C", track on Upstairs at Eric's, a 1982 album by Yazoo
 "I Before E Except After C", 1963 episode of East Side/West Side, a CBS TV series